Jean-Marie Goasmat (Camors, 28 March 1913 — Vannes, 21 January 2006) was a French professional road bicycle racer. Jean-Marie Goasmat was a brother of cyclist Joseph Goasmat.

Major results

1934
Boucles de l'Aulne
1936
Tour de France:
Winner stage 8
1937
Circuit d'Auray
GP Ouest-France
Vire - Cherbourg - Vire
1938
Paris–Camembert
1941
Circuit d'Auray
Trophée des Grimpeurs
1942
Grand Prix des Nations
Trophée des Grimpeurs
1943
Circuit des villes d'eaux d'Auvergne
1945
Circuit Lyonnais
1947
Tour de France:
9th place overall classification
1951
Paris–Bourges

External links 

French male cyclists
1913 births
2006 deaths
French Tour de France stage winners
Sportspeople from Morbihan
Cyclists from Brittany